OC METRO Magazine was a business lifestyle magazine in Orange County, California. OC METRO was the largest of the five magazines published by Newport Beach-based Churm Media, Inc. In 2012, Churm Media was acquired by Freedom Communications. Freedom closed OC METRO in 2014.

References

External links
OC METRO
Churm Media

Lifestyle magazines published in the United States
Monthly magazines published in the United States
Defunct magazines published in the United States
Magazines established in 1990
Magazines disestablished in 2014
Magazines published in California
Mass media in Orange County, California